Little Warrior may refer to:

Literature and arts
The Little Warrior (2021 film), Russian film
The Little Warrior, the original title of the 1920 novel Jill the Reckless
Little Warrior, British documentary about Johana Gómez (boxer), Venezuela
Little Warrior, 2011 album by Shea Rose,  singer-songwriter, performing artist, and music curator based in Boston, Massachusetts
The Little Warrior, a 1969 Hong Kong film with Lydia Shum, Hong Kong comedian, MC, actress and singer

People
 Annie Little Warrior (1895–1966), Hunkpapa Lakota artist
 Iván Pozo,  Spanish professional boxer, known as El Pequeño Guerrero (The Little Warrior)
Barb Honchak,  American professional female mixed martial artist, known as Little Warrior
Willie Barrow,  American civil rights activist and minister, known as Little Warrior

Places
Little Warrior, Alabama, unincorporated community in Blount County, Alabama, United States
Little Warrior River, Blount County, Alabama, United States